Wonderful Wonderful is the fifth studio album by American rock band the Killers, released on September 22, 2017, by Island Records. It is their first studio album in five years, since Battle Born (2012), and their fifth consecutive studio album to top the UK Albums Chart. It is also their first album to top the Billboard 200, moving 118,000 album-equivalent units in its first week. Wonderful Wonderful is the Killers' last album to feature the band's core line-up, with lead guitarist Dave Keuning and bassist Mark Stoermer being absent on Imploding the Mirage (2020) and Pressure Machine (2021), respectively.

Background
Brandon Flowers revealed in May 2015 that he and Dave Keuning were exchanging ideas for the Killers' fifth studio album. The four members reconvened in October 2015, a few months earlier than originally planned. The band began working on the album at their own Battle Born Studios and also rented houses in Joshua Tree National Park and San Diego. They briefly recorded with Ryan Tedder and other producers in Los Angeles before beginning to work with Jacknife Lee, who had been recommended to them by U2 frontman Bono. Lee worked with the band between September 2016 and May 2017 at his home studio in Topanga, California, and at National SouthWestern Recording studios in Las Vegas, Nevada. Lee produced all tracks on the album alongside the Killers, with additional production by Erol Alkan on "The Man" and Stuart Price on "Out of My Mind".

In May 2016, it was announced that bassist Mark Stoermer would take an extended break from touring with the band. However, he continued work on the album, forging many of the tracks alongside Flowers. "He stopped touring with us and it ended up being a blessing for the band. He was much more eager to go to the studio, he felt like he had a monkey off his back, he really contributed a lot to this record." Keuning also announced a hiatus from touring in August 2017, shortly after the album's recording, although he would remain a member of the band.

After celebrating the 10th anniversary of their second album Sam's Town by holding a few concerts, Flowers realized they wanted to make an actual record and not just "slap a bunch of songs together". He stated Wonderful Wonderful is the closest thing they have done to their 2006 album. According to him, the idea for the title of the album came when he was in the desert and saw a storm coming: "I thought 'wonderful, wonderful' and I was able to use it in a song that I wrote with Mark, our bass player, and it ended being an important part of the record."

The Killers enlisted Dire Straits vocalist and lead guitarist Mark Knopfler for a guitar part on "Have All the Songs Been Written?". Australian musician Alex Cameron contributed lyrics to some tracks, including "Run for Cover", which was originally written for the band's third studio album, Day & Age (2008).

Music and lyrics
Lyrically, the album is about what it means to be a man, as Flowers revealed on an interview with Entertainment Weekly: "In your head it's about being tough and bringing home the bacon, but what I've come to find is it's really more about empathy and compassion." He explained how the song "Tyson vs Douglas" was inspired by the 1990 boxing match between Mike Tyson and Buster Douglas, where he explores what it is like to watch a hero fall. For NME magazine, Flowers shared that the lyrics of the album are "the most personal and bare" that he has ever been: "I'm looking in the mirror on this record and focusing a lot on my own personal experiences. Instead of just drawing upon all these experiences and maybe using them in other songs, I am going straight for it with this and singing about my life and my family and that's something different for me."

The track "Rut" was inspired by the struggle of Flowers' wife Tana with posttraumatic stress disorder (PTSD). He said: "Usually I feel protective of her but I decided to take it head on. So 'Rut' is about her submitting to it. That doesn't mean that she's gonna let it beat her, but rather that she's gonna finally acknowledge that it's there and promise to break this cycle." Flowers also added that putting his wife's battle into a song helped him understand better what she is going through. "Have All the Songs Been Written?" was originally the subject line of an email Flowers sent to Bono, in the midst of a bout of writer's block, before the latter suggested it would make an excellent song title.

"The Man" draws inspiration from the disco music of Kool & the Gang's "Spirit of the Boogie"; for this track, Ronnie Vannucci Jr. based his drums on "Peek-a-Boo" by Siouxsie and the Banshees.

Promotion

Singles
Starting on May 6, 2017, the band tweeted a series of photographs and short videos to tease the album's lead single. Among the tweets was a photograph of Brandon Flowers wearing a silver jacket with gold lettering spelling out "The Man", which turned out to be the title of the song. On June 14, 2017, it was finally released as the first single from the album. BBC Radio 1's Annie Mac debuted the track as "Annie Mac's Hottest Record in the World". The music video for "The Man" was released on June 28, 2017, and features a cameo by former Mayor of Las Vegas and current First Gentleman of Las Vegas Oscar Goodman. "The Man" topped the Billboard Adult Alternative Songs chart and reached number two on the Alternative Songs chart.

On July 28, the band released the song "Run for Cover" as the album's first promotional single, which was made available as an instant download for pre-orders of the album. On August 22, a music video for the song was premiered. The song was later sent to alternative radio in the United States on November 14, 2017, serving as the album's second single.

The Killers performed both "The Man" and "Run for Cover" on Jimmy Kimmel Live! on July 31, 2017. The band also performed "The Man" on The Late Show with Stephen Colbert on September 21, at the 2017 MTV Europe Music Awards on November 12, and on BBC One's Sounds Like Friday Night on November 24. On September 30, 2017, the band performed several tracks from the album at the 2017 AFL Grand Final.

The album's third single, "Rut", was serviced to UK hot adult contemporary radio on December 9, 2017. On January 9, 2018, a music video for the single was released, directed by Danny Drysdale.

Promotional singles
The title track and second promotional single "Wonderful Wonderful" was premiered on Beats 1 as Zane Lowe's World Record on August 24. Nearly a year later on August 23, 2018, a music video was released for the title track. "Some Kind of Love" was released on September 15 as the third promotional single from the album, which was influenced by English musician Brian Eno.

Other songs
On the short tour the band embarked on in September 2017, the songs "The Calling", "Tyson vs Douglas", and "Life to Come" were played during the encore. The track "The Calling" featured a reading of a Bible verse from actor Woody Harrelson.

Critical reception

Wonderful Wonderful received generally positive reviews from music critics. At Metacritic, which assigns a normalized rating out of 100 to reviews from mainstream publications, the album received an average score of 71, based on 25 reviews.

AllMusic editor Stephen Thomas Erlewine wrote, "By this point, Flowers' obsessions and signatures are so idiosyncratic, he's clearly the auteur behind Wonderful Wonderful just as he was with The Desired Effect, and the record charms because its ridiculousness is sincere and his sincerity is ridiculous – two qualities that make him and his art messy and quite genuine." Writing a four-star review for NME, Barry Nicolson said, "As a songwriter, Flowers has never been particularly guarded about himself – he's neurotic, driven, sentimental and sometimes corny – but he bares more on 'Wonderful Wonderful' than ever before, and the result is the band's best album since 2006's 'Sam's Town'. It might get lonely at the top, but the Killers aren't going anywhere just yet." A four-star review by The Guardian claims Wonderful Wonderful consists of the band's "best songs in a decade [...] This is certainly big music, which is all the better for its more intimate, touching soul." Rolling Stone gave the album the same 3.5 star rating it gave Hot Fuss (2004) and Day & Age (2008).

In a positive review, Niall Doherty of Q magazine described it as a "glossy indie-pop album with sonics as slick and glistening as a brand-new Vegas skyscraper". In an enthusiastic review, Beat Magazine said: "Rather than releasing an album for the sake of putting out music, Wonderful Wonderful oozes intention, there are no filler songs, boring melodies or lazy lyrics – every detail of the record has been taken into consideration." However, Pranav Trewn from Stereogum said the album "marks their most emphatic embodiment of purposelessness".  Will Hodgkinson's review for The Times was also critical of the album, claiming "Wonderful Wonderful has a sonic scale and production polish matched only by Bono and his world-saving stadium inhabitants, but it also displays U2's weakness for allowing grandiosity to smother intimacy of expression, alongside a desire to be all things to all people." However, when Pitchfork critic Jason Green reviewed Wonderful Wonderful, he ultimately gave it the highest rating that any Killers studio albums had received to date from the publication and concluded, "With the Killers, greatness and ridiculousness go hand in hand."

Accolades

Entertainment Weekly named "Have All the Songs Been Written" as the 28th best song of 2017.

Commercial performance
Wonderful Wonderful debuted at number one on the US Billboard 200, becoming their first record to top the chart. It moved 118,000 album-equivalent units, with 111,000 being pure album sales. Selling 51,756 copies (including 2,711 from sales-equivalent streams) in the United Kingdom in its first week, the Killers became the first international act to chart its first five studio albums at number one. The first-week UK sales (and equivalent) figure exceeded the combined sales (and equivalent) of the rest of the top-five albums. As of August 2020, the album had sold 182,853 copies in the UK. Wonderful Wonderful also debuted atop the Australian albums chart. In Canada, the album was the top-selling album of its debut week, but streaming factoring relegated it to a top-five charting.

Track listing
All tracks are produced by Jacknife Lee, except where noted.

Notes
  signifies an additional producer
  signifies an assistant producer
  signifies a remixer

Sample credits
 "The Man" contains elements of "Spirit of the Boogie" (1975), as performed by Kool & the Gang.
 "Run for Cover" contains an interpolation of "Redemption Song" (1980), as performed by Bob Marley.
 "Tyson vs Douglas" contains a sample of the Mike Tyson vs. James Douglas HBO fight featuring commentary by Jim Lampley, Sugar Ray Leonard and Larry Merchant.

Personnel
Credits adapted from the liner notes of the deluxe edition of Wonderful Wonderful.

The Killers
 Brandon Flowers – vocals, keys 
 Dave Keuning – guitar 
 Mark Stoermer – bass ; guitar ; fretless bass 
 Ronnie Vannucci Jr. – drums

Additional musicians

 Jacknife Lee – guitar, keys, programming 
 Erol Alkan – drum programming, percussion, synth 
 Becca Marie – additional vocals 
 Las Vegas Mass Choir – additional vocals 
 Nina Fechner – additional vocals 
 Justin Diaz – additional vocals 
 Dan Grech-Marguerat – additional programming 
 Roger Joseph Manning Jr. – keys 
 Stuart Price – keys, programming 
 Woody Harrelson – intro narration 
 Mark Knopfler – guitar 
 Davide Rossi – string arrangements, strings

Technical

 Jacknife Lee – production, engineering, programming ; mixing 
 Matt Bishop – engineering 
 Robert Root – engineering ; mixing 
 Malcolm Harrison – engineering assistance 
 Rich Costey – mixing 
 Martin Cooke – engineering assistance 
 Nicolas Fournier – engineering assistance 
 Erol Alkan – additional production 
 Jimmy Robertson – production assistance 
 Dan Grech-Marguerat – mixing 
 Joel Davies – mixing assistance 
 Charles Haydon Hicks – mixing assistance 
 Alan Moulder – mixing 
 Caesar Edmunds – mix engineering 
 Ariel Rechtshaid – mixing 
 Shawn Everett – mixing 
 Stuart Price – additional production ; remix 
 Matt Breunig – engineering 
 The Killers – production 
 Duke Dumont – remix 
 John Davis – mastering 
 Dave Kutch – mastering

Artwork
 Joe Spix – art direction, design
 Brandon Flowers – art direction, design
 Anton Corbijn – photography
 Paul Lane – package production

Charts

Weekly charts

Year-end charts

Certifications

|}

See also
 List of number-one albums of 2017 (Australia)
 List of Billboard 200 number-one albums of 2017
 List of UK Albums Chart number ones of the 2010s

Notes

References

2017 albums
Albums produced by Jacknife Lee
Albums produced by Stuart Price
Island Records albums
The Killers albums